Sam Hamm (born November 19, 1955) is an American screenwriter and comic book writer. Hamm is known for co-writing the screenplay for Tim Burton's Batman. He also received a story credit for Batman Returns (though the final version of the movie differs significantly from his ideas).

DC Comics invited Hamm to write for Detective Comics. The result was Batman: Blind Justice, which introduced Bruce Wayne's mentor, Henri Ducard. Hamm's other screen credits include Never Cry Wolf and Monkeybone.

In February 2021, DC Comics announced that Hamm would return to the 1989 Batman film universe with the limited series Batman '89, which will be a direct continuation of both the 1989 film and Batman Returns.

Selected filmography

References

External links

American male screenwriters
Living people
1955 births
American comics writers
American film producers
American television writers
American television producers
American horror writers
American male television writers